Romanel may refer to:

Romanel-sur-Lausanne, Vaud, Switzerland
Romanel-sur-Morges, Vaud, Switzerland